Giunio Bruto (Italian, Junius Brutus) is a 1781 opera seria in two acts by Domenico Cimarosa to a libretto by Eschilo Acanzio. 

The opera was premiered in 1781 at the opening of Teatro Filarmonico in Verona. During the next two years further performances were given at Genoa, Siena and Pisa. In 1788, Joseph Haydn produced the opera at Esterháza; but despite a lavish staging and alterations to the score by Haydn himself, the production was not successful.

The plot revolves around the love between Lucius Junius Brutus's son Titus and Tullia (named Tarquinia in real life), the daughter of Tarquinius, the last king of Rome, whom Brutus had supplanted.

References
Notes

Sources
 Rossi, Nick and Talmage Fauntleroy (1999). Domenico Cimarosa: his Life and Operas. Westport CT and London: Greenwood Press. 

Operas
1781 operas
Operas based on real people
Italian-language operas
Opera seria
Operas by Domenico Cimarosa
Operas set in ancient Rome
Cultural depictions of Lucius Junius Brutus